The Salamander Ruby (German: Der Rubin-Salamander) is a 1918 German silent drama film directed by Rudolf Biebrach and starring Bruno Decarli, Mechthildis Thein and Hugo Flink.

Cast
 Bruno Decarli as Martin Hellberg 
 Mechthildis Thein as Nelly Sand, Operettensängerin 
 Hugo Flink as Templin, reicher Börsianer 
 Heinrich Schroth as Attenhofer, Landstreicher 
 Rudolf Biebrach as Landgerichtsrat Gottfried Hellberg 
 Richard Wirth as Juwelier Ottrot 
 Gertrude Hoffman as Freundin der Nelly Sand

References

Bibliography
 Hans-Michael Bock & Michael Töteberg. Das Ufa-Buch. Zweitausendeins, 1992.

External links

1918 films
Films of the German Empire
German silent feature films
Films directed by Rudolf Biebrach
German drama films
1918 drama films
UFA GmbH films
German black-and-white films
Films based on German novels
Silent drama films
1910s German films
1910s German-language films